The Haloșul Mare is a right tributary of the river Cașin in Romania. It flows into the Cașin near Mănăstirea Cașin.

References

Rivers of Romania
Rivers of Bacău County